This is a list of bank buildings that are notable.  The architecture of banks in many countries is diverse, but has a common goal of conveying solidity and suggesting confidence in the security of deposits, as a matter of basic marketing.  Numerous bank buildings are recognized as landmarks and/or included in historic registers.  This list includes modern bank buildings as well as historic buildings that no longer serve as banks or that no longer exist.

Argentina

Bank headquarters buildings
Banco de Londres y América del Sur Headquarters, Buenos Aires
Headquarters of the Bank of the Argentine Nation, Buenos Aires
Headquarters of the Provincial Bank of Córdoba, Córdoba

Australia

Bank headquarters buildings in Australia
Commonwealth Trading Bank Building, Sydney, New South Wales
State Savings Bank Building, Sydney, New South Wales
Westpac Place, Sydney

Canada

Bank headquarters buildings in Canada
800 Saint-Jacques Street West
ATB Place
Canadian Western Bank Place
CIBC Square
Commerce Court
Complexe Desjardins
Complexe Maisonneuve
First Canadian Place
HSBC Canada Building
Royal Bank Plaza
Scotia Plaza
Toronto-Dominion Centre
Tour de la Banque Nationale

Other bank buildings in Canada
500 Place D'Armes
Bank of Canada Building
Bank of Canada Building (Toronto)
Bank of Commerce (Halifax, Nova Scotia)
Bank of Commerce Building (Windsor, Ontario)
Bank of Montreal Building (Halifax, Nova Scotia)
Bankers Hall
BDC Building
Bell Media Tower
CIBC 750 Lawrence
CIBC Tower
First Canadian Centre
Place Ville Marie
RBC WaterPark Place
Royal Bank Tower (Vancouver)
Royal Centre (Vancouver)
Scotia Place
Scotia Tower
Scotia Tower (Montreal)
TD Canada Trust Tower (Calgary)
TD Tower (Edmonton)
TD Centre (Halifax, Nova Scotia)
TD Tower (Vancouver)
Thomas D'Arcy McGee Building
Tour de la Banque Nationale
Two Bloor West

Historic bank buildings in Canada
197 Yonge Street
205 Yonge Street
Bank of British North America Building
Bank of Montreal Building (Toronto)
Bank of Montreal Head Office
Bank of Montreal National Historic Site
Bank of Toronto (Yellowknife)
Bank of Upper Canada Building
Canada Permanent Trust Building
Dominion Building
Molson Bank Building
Old Canadian Bank of Commerce Building
One King West Hotel & Residence
Quebec Bank Building, Montreal
Rex Theatre (Whitewood)
Royal Bank Building (Toronto)
Royal Bank Tower (Montreal)
Sir John A. Macdonald Building
Trader's Bank Building
Union Bank Building

China

Bank headquarters buildings in China
Bank of China Building, Shanghai, former headquarters of Bank of China
Bank of Communications Building, Shanghai
Bank of Shanghai Headquarters, Shanghai
Bank of China Tower, Hong Kong, which is headquarters of Bank of China and was the tallest building in Asia when built
Hang Seng Bank Headquarters Building, Hong Kong
HSBC Building (Hong Kong), Hong Kong
Standard Chartered Bank Building, Hong Kong

Other notable bank buildings in China

Denmark
Axelborg, Copenhagen
Danmarks Nationalbank, Copenhagen
Sparekassen Bikuben, Copenhagen
Sparekassen for Kjøbenhavn og Omegn, Copenhagen
Business- and Agricultural Bank of Jutland
Danmarks Nationalbank
Sparekassen Bikuben
Sparekassen for Store Heddinge og omegn

France

Bank headquarters buildings in France
Crédit Lyonnais headquarters, Paris

Germany

Bank headquarters buildings in Germany
Deutsche Bank Twin Towers

Malta

Bank headquarters buildings in Malta
Spinola Palace, Valletta

Philippines

Bank headquarters buildings in the Philippines
Exportbank Plaza
PBCom Tower
RCBC Plaza
UnionBank Plaza

Puerto Rico

United Kingdom

Bank headquarters buildings in the United Kingdom
Northern Bank Headquarters, Belfast, Northern Ireland

United States

Bank headquarters buildings in the U.S.
25 Park Place
200 West Street
388 Greenwich Street
611 Place
1600 Broadway
Albuquerque Plaza
BNY Mellon Center (Philadelphia)
BNY Mellon Center (Pittsburgh)
BOK Tower
Capital One Tower (Virginia)
City National Plaza
Compass Bank Building (Albuquerque)
Farmers and Mechanics Bank (Georgetown)
Fidelity National Bank and Trust Company Building, The
First City Tower
First Interstate Center
First National Bank Building (Pittsburgh)
First National Bank Tower
Huntington Tower
Frost Bank Tower
Hill Building
Investors Bank
Mercantile National Bank Building
Norwest Center (Minneapolis)
Regions Tower (Indianapolis)
One PNC Plaza
One Wells Fargo Center
Fourth and Vine Tower
PNC Plaza (Raleigh)
RBC Plaza (Minneapolis)
State of Georgia Building
SunTrust Plaza
Edward A. Thomas Building
Tower at PNC Plaza
U.S. Bancorp Tower
U.S. Bancorp Center
Winston Tower

Others by state, territory and insular area

KEY

Alabama

Bank of Andalusia
Bank of Ensley
Bank of Fairhope
City National Bank (Tuscaloosa, Alabama)
First National Bank (Huntsville, Alabama)
First National Bank (Mobile, Alabama)
First National Bank Building (Andalusia, Alabama)
Old State Bank (Decatur, Alabama)
Concord Center
Regions Bank Building (Mobile)
Regions Center (Birmingham)
Regions-Harbert Plaza
RSA Trustmark Building
Shipt Tower
Waterman–Smith Building

Arizona
Bank of America Tower (Phoenix)
U.S. Bank Center (Phoenix)
Valley National Bank Building (Tucson, Arizona)
Wells Fargo Plaza (Phoenix)
Gila Valley Bank and Trust Building
Valley National Bank (Casa Grande, Arizona)
Valley National Bank Building (Tucson, Arizona)

Arkansas
Simmons Tower, a modern building
Arkansas Bank & Trust Company
Bank of Booneville Building
Bank of Carthage (Arkansas)
Bank of Clarendon
Bank of Commerce (El Dorado, Arkansas)
Bank of Gentry
Bank of Kingston
Bank of Malvern
Bank of Marshall Building
Bank of Osceola
Bank of Rogers Building
Bank of Searcy
Crittenden County Bank and Trust Company
Dermott Bank & Trust Company Building
El Paso Bank
Exchange Bank (El Dorado, Arkansas)
Exchange Bank Building (Little Rock, Arkansas)
Farmer's State Bank
Farmers and Merchants Bank (Mountain View, Arkansas)
Farmers and Merchants Bank-Masonic Lodge
Farmers Bank Building (Leslie, Arkansas)
Farmers State Bank (Conway, Arkansas)
First National Bank (Siloam Springs, Arkansas)
First National Bank Building (Monette, Arkansas)
First National Bank of Morrilton
German-American Bank
Hiwasse Bank Building
Mercantile Bank Building (Jonesboro, Arkansas)
Merchants & Farmers Bank
Merchants and Planters Bank (Clarendon, Arkansas)
Merchants and Planters Bank Building
Monroe County Bank Building
National Bank of Commerce Building (Paragould, Arkansas)
Old Bank of Amity
Peoples Bank and Loan Building
Peoples Building & Loan Building
Planters Bank Building (Osceola, Arkansas)
Pottsville Citizen's Bank
Worthen Bank Building

California
Bank of America Plaza (Los Angeles)
Bank of California Building (Los Angeles, California)
Bank of Lucas, Turner & Co.
Bank of the West Tower (Sacramento)
Columbia Savings Bank Building
Farmers and Merchants Bank of Los Angeles
Federal Reserve Bank of San Francisco, Los Angeles Branch
Hellman Building
Hibernia Bank Building (San Francisco)
International Savings & Exchange Bank Building
Old Federal Reserve Bank Building (San Francisco)
One Sansome Street
Sanwa Bank Plaza
U.S. Bank Tower (Los Angeles)
Union Bank Plaza
Wells Fargo Center (Los Angeles)
Bank of Italy (Fresno, California)
Bank of Italy (Paso Robles, California)
Bank of Italy (Visalia, California)
Bank of Italy Building (San Francisco)
Bank of Italy, Merced
Bank of Los Banos Building
Bank of Pinole
Calaveras County Bank
Coachella Valley Savings No. 2
Federal Reserve Bank of San Francisco
Old Bank of America Building (Red Bluff, California)
Ontario State Bank Block
Santa Fe Federal Savings and Loan Association
Security Building (Los Angeles)
Security Trust and Savings

Colorado
FirstBank Building
U.S. Bank Tower (Denver)
American National Bank Building (Alamosa, Colorado)
Bank Lofts
Citizens National Bank Building (Glenwood Springs, Colorado)
First National Bank Building (Craig, Colorado)
First National Bank Building (Steamboat Springs, Colorado)
First National Bank of Haxtun
Wheeler Bank
Farmers State Bank Building (1930), Fort Morgan, NRHP-listed in Morgan County
Delta County Bank Building, Delta, NRHP-listed in Delta County

Delaware
Bank of Newark Building
First National Bank of Seaford
Newport National Bank
Sussex National Bank of Seaford
Wilmington Savings Fund Society Building
Wilmington Trust Company Bank

Zimbabwe

Bank headquarters buildings in Zimbabwe
New Reserve Bank Tower

References

Lists of buildings and structures by type
Bank buildings